"Rain (Let the Children Play)" is a song by American-Australian singer Marcia Hines. The song was written and produced by Robyn Smith and released in August 1994 as the lead single from Hines' eighth studio album, Right Here and Now (1994).

Track listing
Australian CD single
 "Rain (Let the Children Play)" (radio edit) – 4:12
 "Rain (Let the Children Play)" (album version) – 4:42
 "Nobody Knows" (album version) – 4:28
 "Nobody Knows" (bonus mix) – 5:33

Charts

References

Marcia Hines songs
1994 songs
1994 singles
Songs written by Robyn Smith (record producer)